Pseudopieris is a genus of butterflies in the subfamily Dismorphiinae. They are native to the Americas.

Species
 Pseudopieris nehemia (Boisduval, 1836) – clean mimic-white
 Pseudopieris viridula (C. Felder & R. Felder, 1861)

References

External links

 
 
Images representing Pseudopieris nehemia at Consortium for the Barcode of Life

Dismorphiinae
Pieridae of South America
Pieridae genera
Taxa named by Frederick DuCane Godman
Taxa named by Osbert Salvin